Dashu is a town under the administration of Hanyuan County, Sichuan, China. , it has three residential communities and five villages under its administration.

References 

Towns in Sichuan
Hanyuan County